Hareram Singh is a politician serving as the MLA of  Jamuria Assembly Constituency since May 2021.

Political Life 
Hareram Singh is a politician from All India Trinamool Congress. He contested Jamuria Vidhan Sabha seat in South West Bengal region and the Paschim Bardhaman district of West Bengal in the 2021 West Bengal Legislative Assembly Election. The constituency is part of Asansol Lok Sabha constituency, an urban constituency. He won the election by a margin of 8051 votes.

2021 West Bengal Assembly Election

References 

West Bengal politicians
Living people
Year of birth missing (living people)